Harvey Jay Jacobs (January 7, 1930 – September 23, 2017) was an American author best known for science fiction and fantasy stories, very often with a humorous and/or satirical bent.

Born in New York City to Louis, a dentist, and Laura Jacobs, Harvey Jacobs received his BA from Syracuse University and attended Columbia University for graduate studies.

Jacobs contributed scripts to Tales from the Darkside and Monsters, both executive produced by George A. Romero. American Goliath, a fictionalized account of the Cardiff Giant hoax, was nominated for the World Fantasy Award for Best Novel in 1998.

Jacobs died September 23, 2017 of a bacterial infection after being diagnosed with cancer. Jacobs is survived by his son Adam and his granddaughter, Charlotte Emerson Jacobs. His wife Estelle died on March 27, 2021.  For inquiries relating to rights, Adam Jacobs can be contacted adam@adamjacobs.com

Bibliography

Novels 
 American Goliath
 Side Effects
 Beautiful Soup
 The Juror
 Summer On A Mountain of Spices
 The Egg of The Glak

Short fiction 

Stories

References

External links
 http://www.HarveyJacobs.org
 

1930 births
2017 deaths
American fantasy writers
American science fiction writers
Columbia University alumni
The Magazine of Fantasy & Science Fiction people
Syracuse University alumni
Writers from New York City
Novelists from New York (state)